The 20th National Television Awards were held at The O2 Arena on 21 January 2015. The event was presented by Dermot O'Leary, who himself was again nominated for an award. The ceremony was broadcast live on ITV.

During the show there was a tribute to Coronation Street actress Anne Kirkbride (Deirdre Barlow) who died on the evening of 19 January 2015, read by on-screen husband and close friend William Roache (Ken Barlow). The end was met with a moment's reflection, leading onto an interval by broadcaster ITV.

Performances
Ben Haenow – "Something I Need"
Pixie Lott and The Proclaimers – "I'm Gonna Be (500 Miles)"

Viewers
The show attracted an average of 6.30 million viewers on the night, up by around 400k viewers from the previous edition and the highest rating since the 2011 viewership of 6.50 million.

Awards

References

External links
Official website

National Television Awards
N
2015 in British television
N
National Television Awards
January 2015 events in the United Kingdom